Michael D. Berger (born June 2, 1967) is a Canadian former professional ice hockey defenceman. He played in the NHL for the Minnesota North Stars.

He also played in the Central Hockey League for the Tulsa Oilers.

Career statistics

Awards
 WHL West Second All-Star Team – 1986 & 1987

References

External links
 

1967 births
Living people
Binghamton Whalers players
Ice hockey people from Edmonton
Indianapolis Checkers players
Indianapolis Ice players
Kansas City Blades players
Knoxville Cherokees players
Lethbridge Broncos players
Minnesota North Stars draft picks
Minnesota North Stars players
Phoenix Roadrunners (IHL) players
Spokane Chiefs players
Thunder Bay Thunder Hawks players
Tulsa Oilers (1992–present) players
Oakland Skates players
Canadian expatriate ice hockey players in the United States
Canadian ice hockey defencemen